Khano Smith (born 10 January 1981) is a Bermudian retired footballer who is serving as a head coach and general manager for USL Championship club Rhode Island FC.

Club career

College and amateur
Smith played college soccer at Champlain College and Lees-McRae College, and in the USL Premier Development League for Carolina Dynamo.

Professional Career
Smith began his professional career playing for the Dandy Town Hornets, who he helped win the 2003–04 Cingular Wireless Premier Division title in his first year at the club. In his second season, he led the league in scoring as Dandy Town finished two points behind Devonshire Cougars. He captured his second trophy with the club in 2005 leading the Hornets to the Bermuda Champions Cup.

After two successful seasons in Bermuda he moved Major League Soccer and signed with New England Revolution in April 2005. He made his first start, and scored his first goal, on 4 June 2005 during a 1–1 tie with the Kansas City Wizards. Smith also scored the winning goal against the MetroStars which led the Revolution to the MLS Conference Championship in 2005. He came to be known in New England for his inconsistent play, showing occasional flashes of brilliance, but also making fundamental mistakes. He was also known for his pace and his crucial crosses which pick out his teammates for easy finishes.

He moved from an out and out striker to an attacking left wing back. In 2007 and 2008 he was the regular starter on the left wing and scored several crucial goals.

On 26 November 2008, Smith was selected by Seattle Sounders FC with the fourth pick in the 2008 MLS Expansion Draft. Before ever playing a match for the Sounders, he was traded to New York Red Bulls in exchange for allocation money. On 30 July 2009 New York waived Smith.

After trialing with Southend United, and playing for their reserves in a 4–0 defeat to Norwich City reserves in September 2009, Smith was offered a professional contract at Lincoln City, having impressed new manager Chris Sutton on a 10-day trial. On 23 October Smith was reported to have signed a 'short-term' deal with Lincoln.

Smith became an instant first team regular at Lincoln. However, he was dropped after six games due to consistently poor performances, his final one coming in an FA Cup game at Northwich Victoria and he struggled badly against a side who were two divisions below the Imps. He was released when his contract expired on 7 January 2010. He was voted in an online poll as the worst of the 41 players to have represented Lincoln City during the 2009–10 season.

Smith re-signed with New England Revolution on 26 March 2010 after trialing with the team during pre-season.

After the 2010 Major League Soccer season New England declined Smith's contract option and he elected to participate in the 2010 MLS Re-Entry Draft. Smith became a free agent in Major League Soccer when he was not selected in the Re-Entry draft. On 7 March 2011 he signed with Carolina RailHawks of the North American Soccer League. However, Smith was not listed on the 2011 roster released by the club on 4 April 2011. In an interview with Bermuda's The Royal Gazette on 7 April, Smith stated he would not play for Carolina due to a contract dispute.

International career
Smith made his debut for Bermuda in a December 2003 friendly match against Barbados and earned a total of 33 caps, scoring 10 goals. He represented his country in 13 FIFA World Cup qualification matches.

International goals

Managerial Career

Smith was named assistant coach for Orlando Pride in the National Women's Soccer League in December 2015. On 18 December 2018, Smith joined the technical staff of expansion club Birmingham Legion FC ahead of their first season in the USL Championship.

Smith was announced as the first-ever head coach and general manager of Rhode Island FC on March 8, 2023.

Honors

Dandy Town Hornets
Cingular Wireless Premier Division Champion (1): 2004
Bermuda Champions Cup (1): 2004–05

New England Revolution
Lamar Hunt U.S. Open Cup (1): 2007
North American SuperLiga (1): 2008

Individual
 Cingular Wireless Premier Division Top Scorer: 2005

References

External links

 FIFA Statistics

1981 births
Living people
People from Paget Parish
Association football wingers
Bermudian footballers
Bermudian expatriate footballers
Expatriate soccer players in the United States
Expatriate footballers in England
North Carolina Fusion U23 players
Dandy Town Hornets F.C. players
New England Revolution players
New York Red Bulls players
Lincoln City F.C. players
Bermuda Hogges F.C. players
Real Boston Rams players
USL League Two players
Major League Soccer players
English Football League players
Bermudian expatriate sportspeople in England
Bermudian expatriate sportspeople in the United States
New England Revolution non-playing staff
Bermuda international footballers
Orlando Pride non-playing staff
Birmingham Legion FC
USL Championship coaches
Bermudian football managers